Calamity is a 1982 Czechoslovak comedy film directed by Vera Chytilová.

Cast 
 Bolek Polívka - Honza Dostál
 Dagmar Bláhová - Majka
  - Primárka
 Marie Pavlíková - Bábicka
  - Kveta
 Zdeněk Svěrák - Ucitel
 Václav Svorc - Nácelník
 Bronislav Poloczek - Rezník
 Václav Helsus - Strojvedoucí
 Zdeněk Dítě - Lesník

References

External links 

1982 comedy films
1982 films
Czechoslovak comedy films
Czech comedy films
Films directed by Věra Chytilová
1980s Czech-language films
1980s Czech films